Eliza Illiard (1905–1969) was a German singer and actress.

Selected filmography
 What Am I Without You (1934)
 Paganini (1934) 
 Scandal at the Fledermaus (1936)
 Love's Awakening (1936)

References

Bibliography
 Noack, Frank. Veit Harlan: "des Teufels Regisseur". Belleville, 2000.

External links

1905 births
1969 deaths
German film actresses
Musicians from Cologne
20th-century German women singers